The Borsa İstanbul (abbreviated as BIST) is the sole exchange entity of Turkey combining the former Istanbul Stock Exchange (ISE),  the Istanbul Gold Exchange and the Derivatives Exchange of Turkey under one umbrella. It was established as an incorporated company with a founding capital of  423,234,000 (approx. US$240 million) on April 3, 2013, and began to operate on April 5, 2013. Its slogan is worth investing. 

Shareholders of Borsa İstanbul are: 49% Government of Turkey, 41% IMKB, 5% VOB, 4% IMKB members, 1% IMKB brokers and 0.3% IAB members. It is planned that all the Government-owned shares will be offered for sale. Among the executives of the nine-member board of directors, which is presided by chairman Himmet Karadağ, are former deputy chairman of ISE Osman Akyüz, former head of VOB Işınsu Kestelli, Merrill Lynch Investment Bank General Manager Hüseyin Kelezoğlu and Chairman of Turkish Association of Capital Market Intermediary Institutions Attila Köksal.

History

Early days of the securities market in Turkey

The origin of an organized securities market in Turkey has its roots in the second half of the 19th century. The first securities market in the Ottoman Empire was established in Istanbul in 1866 for refinancing the Ottoman foreign debt taken during the Crimean War (1853–1856) through government bonds. With a law in 1873 it was formally renamed as the Dersaadet Securities Exchange (Turkish: Dersaadet Tahvilat Borsası). It created a medium for European investors who were seeking higher returns in the vast Ottoman markets. Following the proclamation of the Turkish Republic, a new law was enacted in 1929 to reorganize the fledgling capital markets under the new name of "Istanbul Securities and Foreign Exchange Bourse". 

Soon, the Bourse became very active and contributed substantially to the funding requirements of new enterprises across the country. However, its success was clouded by a string of events, including the Great Depression of 1929 and the impending World War II abroad which had taken their toll in the just developing business world in Turkey. During the industrial drive of the subsequent decades, there was a continuous increase in the number and size of joint stock companies, which began to open up their equity to the public. Those mature shares faced a strong and growing demand from mostly individual investors and some institutional investors.

1980s to the present

The early phase of the 1980s saw a marked improvement in the Turkish capital markets, both in regard to the legislative framework and the institutions required to set the stage for sound capital movements. In 1981, the "Capital Market Law" was enacted. The next year, the main regulatory body responsible for the supervision and regulation of the Turkish securities market, the Capital Markets Board based in Ankara, was established. A new decree was issued in October 1983 foreseeing the setting up of securities exchanges in the country. In October 1984, the "Regulations for the Establishment and Functions of Securities Exchanges" was published in the Official Gazette. The regulations concerning operational procedures were approved in the parliament and the Istanbul Stock Exchange was formally inaugurated at the end of 1985.

The Istanbul Stock Exchange (ISE) was the only corporation in Turkey for securities exchange established to provide trading in equities, bonds and bills, revenue-sharing certificates, private sector bonds, foreign securities and real estate certificates as well as international securities. The ISE was founded as an autonomous, professional organization in early 1986. It is situated in a modern building complex in the quarter of İstinye, on the European side of Istanbul, since May 15, 1995. 

ISE is home to 320 national companies. Trading hours are 09:30–12:30 for the first session and 14:00–17:30 for the second session, on workdays. All ISE members are incorporated banks and brokerage houses.

ISE price indices are computed and published throughout the trading session while the return indices are calculated and published at the close of the session only. The indices are: ISE National-All Shares Index, ISE National-30, ISE National-50, ISE National-100, Sector and sub-sector indices, ISE Second National Market Index, ISE New Economy Market Index and ISE Investment Trusts Index. The ISE National-100 Index contains both the ISE National-50 and ISE National-30 Index and is used as a main indicator of the national market.

On April 5, 2013, the Istanbul Stock Exchange merged with the Istanbul Gold Exchange and was reorganized and renamed as Borsa Istanbul.

Logo of Borsa Istanbul
The current logo of Borsa Istanbul is the traditional flower of Istanbul's imperial gardens, the tulip (also the namesake of the Tulip period in Ottoman history), which was first introduced to the Europeans in Vienna, 1554, as a gift by Ottoman Sultan Suleiman the Magnificent to Charles V, Holy Roman Emperor, of the House of Habsburg. The tulip later even became a valuable investment commodity in Europe, especially in Habsburg Netherlands, during the Tulip mania of the 17th century.

Annual Returns 
The following table shows the annual development of the ISE National-100 since 1990.

Memberships of ISE
The ISE is a full member of:
World Federation of Exchanges (WFE),
Federation of Euro-Asian Stock Exchanges (FEAS),
International Securities Services Association (ISSA),
International Capital Market Association (ICMA),
European Capital Markets Institute (ECMI),
World Economic Forum (WEF),
Federation of European Securities Exchanges (FESE) 
 Sustainable Stock Exchanges (SSE) initiative  and

The ISE is an affiliate member of:
International Organization of Securities Commissions (IOSCO).

Fossil fuel investments
According to Carbon Tracker in 2021 $1 b of investment in coal power was at risk of stranding, including $300 m for EÜAŞ.

ISE and arts
There is a four-meter high marble statue of the "Bull and Bear", in front of the ISE building’s protocol entrance. Created by one of Turkey’s foremost sculptors, Mehmet Aksoy, the statue symbolizes the behavior of the world’s stock markets, an aggressive bull poised to attack the surrendering bear. Another group of statues, sculptured by Şermin Güner, made in the honor of all existing and deceased brokers, represents brokers engaged in executing orders and is placed at the main entrance. 

The Istanbul Stock Exchange makes contributions to the arts by organizing exhibitions and concerts as well as sponsoring important artistic events in Istanbul.

See also
 List of companies listed on the Istanbul Stock Exchange
 Economy of Turkey
 List of stock exchanges
 List of European stock exchanges
 List of Mideast stock exchanges

References

External links
 Official website

Financial services companies of Turkey
Economy of Turkey
Stock exchanges in Europe
Stock exchanges in the Middle East
Companies based in Istanbul
Financial services companies established in 2013
Derivatives (finance)
Turkish companies established in 2013